Every Move You Make (Traditional Chinese title:讀心神探) is a 2010 Hong Kong police procedural television serial drama produced by TVB. The 20-episode drama originally aired five days a week, running from 4 to 29 October 2010 on the TVB Jade channel. In the show, Senior Inspector Linus Yiu (Bowie Lam) and his colleagues of West Kowloon Police Headquarters' CID unit use the Facial Action Coding System, body language study, microexpression interpretations, and applied psychology to solve and assist in criminal investigations.
The human's gesture, can be pretended by the cerebrum, but when facing unusual events happening all of a sudden, or being questioned unawares, then the human's gesture will finally tell the truth.

Synopsis
Crime Unit Senior Inspector, Linus Yiu (Bowie Lam) has learnt his mind reading skills overseas. He is efficient and, by far, the most competent cop in his unit. He is able to analyze and read people's minds just by observing their body language, facial expressions and from the tone of voice. In addition, he is also highly skilled when spotting disparities in testimonies and evidence.

However, his teammates find him to be a real pain in the neck. Newcomers, Phoenix (Kristal Tin) and Trevor (Bosco Wong) are especially annoyed by the unconventional way in which he does things. As a result, the pair often has confrontations and misunderstandings with the inspector. Things become worse when Linus learns that his half-sister, Perlie (Aimee Chan) is secretly going out with Trevor, and that Phoenix, who has recently been divorced, has a crush on Linus.

Cast and characters

CID team members

Supporting characters
Perlie Ching, portrayed by Aimee Chan, is Linus' younger half-sister.
Chung Sau-han, portrayed by Susan Tse, is Linus and Perlie's biological mother.
Ching Shiu-hong, portrayed by Yu Yang, is the youngest son of the Ching family, Sau-han's husband, Perlie's biological father and Linus' stepfather.

Recurring characters
Ching Shiu-on, portrayed by Lau Kong is the eldest son of the Ching family.
Lo Sui-heung, portrayed by Fung So-bor is Siu-on's wife.
Ching Yin-ha, portrayed by Helen Ma, is the eldest daughter of the Ching family.
Ching Yin-ping, portrayed by Mannor Chan, is the youngest daughter of the Ching family.

Awards and nominations
TVB Anniversary Awards (2010)
 Nominated: Best Drama (Top 5)
 Nominated: Best Actor (Bowie Lam)

Viewership ratings

References

External links
TVB.com Every Move You Make - Official Website 
K for TVB Every Move You Make - English Synopsis 

TVB dramas
2010 Hong Kong television series debuts
2010 Hong Kong television series endings